The Schoonebeek oil field is an oil field located in Schoonebeek, Drenthe. It was discovered in 1943 and developed by Royal Dutch Shell. It began production in 1947 and produces oil.

References

Oil fields in the Netherlands